Hà Ngọc Diễm (born December 22, 1994) is a retired Vietnamese volleyball player. She is a former member of Vietnam women's volleyball team. At 2014 VTV International Women's Volleyball Cup, she won her first title representing for national team. In 2015, Ha Ngoc Diem plays for VTV Bình Điền Long An, with captain Nguyễn Thị Ngọc Hoa to help the team win the 1st place at Vietnam Volleyball League Championship, defeat Thông tin Liên Việt Post Bank 3-2 in final.

Diễm played on loan with VTV Bình Điền Long An the 2015/16 season and the 2017, on loan with Thông tin Liên Việt Post Bank.

Clubs
 Vĩnh Long VC (2009–2019)
 VTV Bình Điền Long An (2015–2016)
 Thông tin Liên Việt Post Bank (2017)
 Vietinbank (2018)

Awards

Clubs
 2015 Vietnam League -  3rd place with VTV Bình Điền Long An
 2016 Vietnam League -  3rd place with VTV Bình Điền Long An

References

Vietnamese women's volleyball players
1994 births
Living people
People from Vĩnh Long province
Vietnam women's international volleyball players
Southeast Asian Games silver medalists for Vietnam
Southeast Asian Games bronze medalists for Vietnam
Southeast Asian Games medalists in volleyball
Competitors at the 2017 Southeast Asian Games
Outside hitters
21st-century Vietnamese women